Melissa Roxburgh (born December 10, 1992) is a Canadian and American actress. She is known for her roles in Diary of a Wimpy Kid: Rodrick Rules (2011) and Diary of a Wimpy Kid: Dog Days (2012), as Ensign Syl in the 2016 film Star Trek Beyond, as Olivia Tanis in The Marine 4: Moving Target, and as Michaela Stone in the NBC/Netflix science fiction drama series Manifest.

Early life 
Roxburgh is the second oldest of four children; she has two sisters (Kristie and Ashley) and one younger brother (Matt). Her father, Cam, is a Canadian pastor, and her mother, Shelley Walpole, is a British retired professional tennis player. Her parents, after moving to Canada from the United States, founded a church in Vancouver. After graduating from high school, Roxburgh began pursuing acting in Vancouver. Roxburgh is an alumna of the William Esper Studio.

Career 
She landed her first major role in Diary of a Wimpy Kid: Rodrick Rules as Rachel. She went on to also appear in the second sequel of Diary of a Wimpy Kid, Dog Days, but as a different character, Heather Hills. Her other work in films has included Big Time Movie, Jeni in Leprechaun: Origins, and Ensign Syl in Star Trek Beyond. Her television work has included the Supernatural spinoff, Bloodlines, and Thea in The CW's drama series, Valor.

Roxburgh portrays Michaela Stone in the NBC series Manifest, which premiered on September 24, 2018. On August 28, 2021 it was announced that Manifest will return for a fourth and final season on Netflix.

Personal life 
Roxburgh has a passion for travel. Growing up, her family visited Africa, Europe and South America, which began Roxburgh's interest in social justice issues. She currently serves as a GenR Leader for the International Rescue Committee (IRC), which assists people in extreme humanitarian crises. Prior to her work on Manifest, Roxburgh studied Communications at Simon Fraser University in hopes of becoming a journalist. In 2018 she began a relationship with colleague J.R. Ramirez, whom she met on the set of the tv series Manifest. The two briefly split in 2021, only to get back together in 2022.

Filmography

References

External links
 

1992 births
20th-century Canadian actresses
21st-century Canadian actresses
Actresses from Vancouver
Canadian expatriate actresses in the United States
Canadian film actresses
Canadian television actresses
Living people
Simon Fraser University alumni
William Esper Studio alumni